This is a list of radio stations of Banda Aceh in Indonesia.

Radio Stations
 A Radio FM 96.1
 KISS FM 91.8
 Flamboyant FM 105.2
 THREE FM 94.5
 Nikoya FM 106
 SERAMBI FM 90.2
 Baiturrahman FM 98.5

References

Aceh
Banda Aceh
Banda Aceh